"Lady Barbara" is a song written by  Totò Savio,  Giancarlo Bigazzi, and Claudio Cavallaro and performed by  Renato dei Profeti, founder of the group I Profeti at his first solo venture. The song won the Un disco per l'estate festival and peaked at first place on the Italian hit parade. The same year the song also named a musicarello film, Lady Barbara, directed by Mario Amendola and starred by the same Renato dei Profeti.

The same year the song was adapted into English by Errol Brown and  Tony Wilson, and the cover version performed by Peter Noone and Herman's Hermits, reached #7 in New Zealand and #13 in the United Kingdom in 1970.  It was the last single of the Herman's Hermits that featured Peter Noone. This version was produced by Mickie Most.

References

1970 songs
1970 singles
Italian songs
Number-one singles in Italy
Songs written by Errol Brown
Songs written by Giancarlo Bigazzi
Herman's Hermits songs
Song recordings produced by Mickie Most
RAK Records singles
Songs written by Totò Savio